Collinsella massiliensis  is a Gram-positive, obligatly anaerobic, non-spore-forming, rod shaped and non-motile bacterium from the genus of Collinsella which has been isolated from human feces from the Timone Hospital in France.

References

 

Coriobacteriaceae
Bacteria described in 2016